Giriraj Mani Pokharel is a Nepalese politician and the former Minister of Education, Science and Technology. He is also a member of the Standing Committee of the Unified Communist Party of Nepal (Maoist).

Political Life 
On April 12, 2007, Janamorcha Nepal, of which he was then a vice-chairman, nominated him as the new Minister of Health. Pokharel was appointed to the said position on April 29, 2007. In April 2008, he won the Mahottari-1 seat in the Constituent Assembly election as a candidate of Janamorcha Nepal (People's Front Nepal). He then served a second term as Minister of Health and Population, in the government formed under the leadership of the Communist Party of Nepal (Maoist) after it won the most seats in the Constituent Assembly election.

Pokharel's second term as Minister of Health and Population was from 31 August 2008 until 4 May 2009, when then Prime Minister Pushpa Kamal Dahal (Prachanda) resigned along with his cabinet and dissolved the government. Pokharel began his second term as the sole representative in the government of his party Janamorcha Nepal. However, in January 2009, Janamorcha Nepal and its parent party, the Communist Party of Nepal (Unity Centre) united with the Communist Party of Nepal to become the Unified Communist Party of Nepal (Maoist). Pokharel completed his second term as Minister of Health and Population as a representative of the Unified Communist Party of Nepal (Maoist).

After the unification of the two parties, Pokharel was elected to the party's Standing Committee. He is also in-charge of the party's Health Department.

References

Government ministers of Nepal
Living people
Communist Party of Nepal (Maoist Centre) politicians
Nepalese atheists
Nepal Communist Party (NCP) politicians
Nepal MPs 2017–2022
Health ministers of Nepal
Education ministers of Nepal
People from Sarlahi District
1959 births
Members of the 1st Nepalese Constituent Assembly
Members of the 2nd Nepalese Constituent Assembly